Københavns Lufthavne is a public limited company that operates two airports in Copenhagen, Denmark: Copenhagen Airport and Roskilde Airport. In addition, the company previously held a 49% stake in Newcastle International Airport and 10% of Aeropuertos del Sureste that operated nine airports in Mexico.

The largest owners of Københavns Lufthavne are Macquarie Infrastructure Company (52.4%) and the Government of Denmark (39.2%).  The company was created by the government in 1925 to operate the airport. Until 1990 the company was a government enterprise called Københavns Lufthavnsvæsen. In 1990 it was transformed to a limited company. The government sold 25% of its stake in the company in 1994, and Københavns Lufthavne was listed on the Copenhagen Stock Exchange. In 1996 and 2000 the government sold additional 24% and 17%, respectively.

References

Airport operators
Real estate companies established in 1925
Companies based in Tårnby Municipality
Transport companies based in Copenhagen
Danish companies established in 1925
Government-owned companies of Denmark